Davoodi is a surname. Notable people with the surname include:

Ali Murad Davudi (1922–1979?), Iranian academic and religious official
Arzhang Davoodi (born 1952), Iranian democracy activist
Nader Davoodi (born 1963), Iranian photojournalist
Parviz Goner Davoodi (born 1952), Iranian politician
Růžena Škodová-Davoodi (born 1948), Czech-German Basketball and chessplayer

See also
Davudi, village in Hormozgan Province, Iran